Bae Joo-hyun (born March 29, 1991), known professionally as Irene, is a South Korean singer, television host and actress. After training for five years, she debuted as the leader of girl group Red Velvet in 2014 and later formed a duo sub-unit with her bandmate Seulgi, named Red Velvet - Irene & Seulgi, in 2020.

Irene hosted the television programs Music Bank (2015–2016), Laundry Day (2016–2017), and Irene's Work & Holiday (2022), as well as various music festivals and award events. Irene starred in Women at a Game Company (2016) and Double Patty (2021).

Early life and career

1991–2014: Early life and career beginnings

Irene was born Bae Joo-hyun on March 29, 1991, in Daegu, South Korea. She grew up in Buk-gu. Her family consists of her parents and a younger sister. She attended Haknam High School in Daegu.

She joined SM Entertainment in 2009 and trained for five years.

During her time as a trainee, in August 2013, she appeared in the music video of her then-labelmate Henry Lau's song "1-4-3".

On December 9, 2013, Irene was one of the second batch of trainees introduced as a member of SM Rookies, a pre-debut team of trainees under SM Entertainment, alongside former trainee Lami and now-NCT member Jaehyun.

During SM Rookies, in January 2014, she alongside Seulgi as well as now-NCT members Johnny and Taeyong appeared in The Celebrity magazine. In February 2014, Irene, Seulgi and Taeyong appeared in the OhBoy! magazine.

Various clips of Irene were released in SM Entertainment's official YouTube channel, "SMTOWN", one of which included her and Seulgi dancing to "Be Natural", a song originally performed by SM Entertainment's group S.E.S., showcasing their dancing on July 17, 2014.

On July 27, 2014, she was introduced as a member and the leader of the girl group Red Velvet. They made official debut with the single "Happiness". Since then, Red Velvet has released eleven EPs and two studio albums as well as two reissue albums. They have become regarded as one of the most popular K-pop groups in South Korea and worldwide. In November 2014, Irene appeared in the music video of Kyuhyun's ballad single "규현 '광화문에서 (At Gwanghwamun)".

2015–present: Solo activities and sub-unit

From May 2015 to June 2016, Irene hosted the music show Music Bank with actor Park Bo-gum. They both gained attention for their chemistry as well as singing and hosting skills. The press called them one of the best partnerships in the show's history.

In July 2016, Irene made her acting debut in the web drama Women at a Game Company where she played the female lead. In the same month, Irene was cast in Hello! Our Language, a sitcom that was set on teaching viewers proper Korean, and she played as detective. On October 14, Irene became a host of OnStyle's fashion show Laundry Day. The show premiered on October 22, 2016. In the same month, she became a panelist on the KBS show Trick & True with bandmate Wendy. In March 2017, Irene partnered with actor Kim Min-jae for the portrayal of two lovers in the MV of Red Velvet's SM Station ID "Would U". In July 2019, SM Entertainment announced that Irene would be collaborating with South Korean DJ and producer Raiden on the track "The Only", which was released on August 2.

On April 20, 2020, SM confirmed that Irene, alongside member Seulgi, would form Red Velvet's first sub-unit. Red Velvet - Irene & Seulgi debuted on July 6 with the extended play Monster. A short solo performance MV of her, titled Episode 2: IRENE, was also released. She and Seulgi also starred in a spin-off version of their reality show Level Up Project!
On July 16, 2020, SM confirmed that Irene would be acting in the upcoming film Double Patty, which was to be released later on that year, but it was later postponed to February 2021. She is to play the role of Lee Hyun-Ji, an aspiring anchor. Irene also released her own OST, titled "A White Night", for the movie.

Other ventures

Endorsements
Irene has been hailed a "CF Queen" due to her huge marketing power and numerous endorsement deals ranging from cosmetics, luxury apparel items, and up to basic commodities. Besides her endorsements with Red Velvet as a group, she also became a model for Ivy Club together with labelmates EXO in 2015. In 2016, she became an endorser of coffee brand Maxwell House. In January 2017, Irene became the new brand model for Nuovo Shoes. In August 2017, Irene was also chosen to be the promotional model for the MMORPG Age of Ring (반지). In the same year, she became the official endorser of Hyundai Auto Advantage program.

On February 26, 2018, Irene was selected to be the model of contact lens brand Cooper Vision. In the same month, she became an exclusive model of the British casual accessory brand Hazzy's Accessories. On May 3, she became the brand model for famous vitamin brand LEMONA Vitamin C and was given the title “human vitamin”. On August 9, she was announced as the new exclusive model for French sports brand Eider for fall/winter of 2018 and spring/summer of 2019. In November 2018, Irene, together with Wendy, also became an endorser of Dongwon Yangban Rice Porridge. In December, she was chosen to be the face for HiteJinro Chamisul soju brand.

In February 2019, Irene was announced as the new muse of the Italian luxury jewelry brand Damiani, becoming the first Asian to represent the brand as a muse. In the same year, she also became the face of fashion brand Miu Miu. In March 2019, she attended Paris Fashion Week and caused a craze at Miu Miu's AW19 show.

As her global influence continues to rise, Irene became the new ambassador for mid-range beauty brand Clinique in Asia Pacific in March 2020. On September 17, 2020, Irene was announced as the new ambassador for Prada.

Impact and influence
In Gallup Korea's Idol Preference poll (before it was discontinued in 2020), Irene was named as one of the topmost loved idol celebrity in South Korea. In 2019, in a separate survey among soldiers doing mandatory military service in South Korea, Irene was ranked as the third most popular female K-pop idol. The popularity of Irene have led her to endorsing several brands, she also topped 'Individual Girl Group Members Brand Power Ranking' published by the Korean Corporate Reputation Research Institute placing within top 3 several times in 2018.

Personal life
In February 2020, Irene donated ₩100 million  for the Community Chest of Korea to help support those affected by the COVID-19 pandemic in South Korea.

Controversies 

On October 21, 2020, Irene came under fire for mistreating and lashing out at a fashion editor (according to a now-deleted Instagram post of that fashion editor). Irene took to the social media platform to post an official statement, apologizing for her poor words and actions. SM Entertainment also subsequently released a statement apologizing for causing concern to many people. The heated controversy had caused widespread reaction as it sparked larger conversations about the deep-rooted "gapjil" (갑질) culture in Korean society. Experts and spokespersons of various political movements in South Korea believed that much of the public outrage towards Irene stems from the country's reckoning with "gapjil" (or abusive conduct and bullying by people in positions of power or seniority), an issue that the country has been trying to eradicate and tone down. The perception of the general public in South Korea toward members of idol groups also came to light with regards to the incident, wherein women in particular are held to a higher standard compared to male artists when it comes to controversies.

Following further numerous speculations in regards to the incident, staffers who had previously worked with Irene voiced their opinion to defend the musician. Some stylists, dancers, and make-up artists that worked with her had also posted on their Instagram accounts that they had never experienced such rude actions that are being shared about Irene. The staffs shared that Irene is someone who has a clear understanding of what she wants and has the talent to deliver her opinions clearly; she also knows how to appreciate her staff through giving handwritten cards and gifts to staff members. Ellena Yim, a former SM stylist and visual director, also claimed there are always "two sides to every story" and it's unfortunate that people refused to look at the other side of the story as they only concentrate on what has been revealed and what they want to see.

The involved fashion editor also spoke up about rumors circulating online and asked to stop the speculations. She emphasized that there was no monetary settlement, and only an exchange of "sincere apologies" occurred when they had met again.

Discography

As lead artist

As featured artist

Filmography

Film

Television series

Television shows

Web shows

Hosting

Music video

Music video appearances

Awards and nominations

References

External links

  

Red Velvet (group) members

SM Rookies members
South Korean women pop singers
South Korean female idols
South Korean women rappers
South Korean television actresses
21st-century South Korean women singers
People from Daegu

Living people
1991 births